Verney Junction is a hamlet in the parish of Middle Claydon in north Buckinghamshire, England.  It is on the route of the former Varsity Line. , the line is disused but is scheduled to be reopened by about 2025 as part of the East West Rail project.

The stone cottages that make up the hamlet were largely constructed to provide houses for workers on the railway in the early Victorian era.  The hamlet is named after the railway junction around which it grew. The new village included a cricket ground for the railway workers.

The original junction here was established (without a station) by the Buckinghamshire Railway, which planned a Bletchley  Banbury route (subsequently the 'Banbury to Verney Junction Branch Line') and a Bletchley  Oxford route. Verney Junction railway station was added when the Metropolitan Railway was extended here (from Baker Street).

Local legend has it that the station was so called because the then isolation of the area meant that the only obvious name was that of the local landowner, the Verney family of Claydon House.

References

Hamlets in Buckinghamshire